White Tomb is the debut album by Irish ambient black metal band Altar of Plagues. It was recorded at Data Studios, Kerry.

Track listing

Personnel
Altar of Plagues
 James Kelly – vocals, guitars, keyboards
 Jeremiah Spillane – guitars
 Dave Condon – bass, vocals
 S. MacAnri – drums

Guest musicians
 Stephen Lordan - guest vocals on "Gentian Truth"
 Nathan Misterek - guest vocals on "Earth: As a Furnace" and "Gentian Truth"

Production and recording
 Ross O'Donovan - recording and mixing
 Jason Carroll - assistant engineering
 Colin Marston - mastering

References

2009 albums
Altar of Plagues albums
Profound Lore Records albums